The 1989 DHL Open was a women's tennis tournament played on outdoor hard courts at the Kallang Tennis Centre in Singapore and was part of the Category 1 tier of the 1989 Virginia Slims World Championship Series. The tournament took place from 10 April through 16 April 1989. Second-seeded Belinda Cordwell won the singles title and earned $12,000 first-prize money.

Finals

Singles

 Belinda Cordwell defeated  Akiko Kijimuta 6–1, 6–0
 It was Cordwell's 1st title of the year and the 2nd of her career.

Doubles

 Belinda Cordwell /  Elizabeth Smylie defeated  Ann Henricksson /  Beth Herr 6–7(6–8), 6–2, 6–1
 It was Cordwell's 2nd title of the year and the 3rd of her career. It was Smylie's 2nd title of the year and the 23rd of her career.

References

External links
 ITF tournament edition details
 Tournament draws

DHL Open
WTA Singapore Open
1989 in Singaporean sport